Immobilization may refer to:

Chemistry
 Enzyme immobilization, a concept in organic chemistry
 Immobilization (soil science), the absorption of decomposed organic matter by micro-organisms
 Whole cell immobilization, a biochemistry method

Medicine
 Immobilization (healing), holding an injured joint or bone in place with a splint, cast, or brace to prevent movement while healing
 Muscle immobilization, the complete loss of muscle function for one or more muscle groups
 Trauma immobilization, designed to provide rigid support during movement of a person with suspected spinal or limb injuries
 Bed rest, medical treatment in which a person lies in bed for most of the time to try to cure an illness
 Sedentary lifestyle, a lifestyle type in which one is physically inactive

Other uses
 Automobile immobilization, for vehicle theft prevention
 Economic immobilization, a concept in financial economics

See also
 Immobile (disambiguation)
 Immobilizer (disambiguation)
 Immobilon